Balliettsville is an unincorporated community in North Whitehall Township in Lehigh County, Pennsylvania. It is part of the Lehigh Valley, which had a population of 861,899 and was the 68th most populous metropolitan area in the U.S. as of the 2020 census.

Balliettsville is located at the intersection of Pennsylvania Route 329 and Mauch Chunk Road, eight miles north of Allentown and six miles west of Northampton. The estimated population is around 1,000 people. The village is served by the Parkland School District.

History 
Balliettsville is the oldest village in North Whitehall Township. The town is named for Paulus Balliet, who owned the land the village now comprises.

References

Unincorporated communities in Lehigh County, Pennsylvania
Unincorporated communities in Pennsylvania